Valavannur  is a Grama Panchayat in the Malappuram District of the Indian state of Kerala The town is located  south-west of Malappuram.

Places
 Valavannur Juma Masjid
 Cheravannur North Juma Masjid
 Kadungathukundu Mahallu Juma Masjid

Education
 Ansar Arabic College Valavannur
 Ansar English School Valavannur
 Bafakhy Yatheem Khana Valavannur is an educational hub containing several schools and colleges associated with an orphanage.

Important towns
Kadungathukundu town lies in two Panchayats, Kalpakanchery and Valavannur. Kadungathukundu is also an educational hub.

Demographics
 India census, Valavannur had a population of 30615 with 14356 males and 16259 females.

See also
Kalpakanchery
Kurukkoli Moideen

References

   Villages in Malappuram district